Susan Weinschenk (born December 24, 1953) is an American behavioral psychologist who has been working in the field of design and user experience since 1985. She has published five books on user experience in computer systems and has spoken at many conferences She also is the founder of the Weinschenk Institute.

Bibliography
 Weinschenk, Susan. How To Get People To Do Stuff"' Berkeley, CA: New Riders, 2013. London : Pearson Education
 Weinschenk, Susan. 100 Things Every Designer Needs To Know About People" Berkeley, CA: New Riders, 2011. London : Pearson Education 
 Weinschenk, Susan. Neuro Web Design: What Makes Them Click? Berkeley, CA: New Riders, 2009.  
 Weinschenk, Susan, and Dean T. Barker. Designing Effective Speech Interfaces. New York: Wiley, 2000.
 Weinschenk, Susan, Pamela Jamar, and Sarah C. Yeo. GUI Design Essentials. New York: Wiley Computer Pub, 1997.
 Weinschenk, Susan, and Sarah C. Yeo. Guidelines for Enterprise-Wide GUI Design. New York: Wiley, 1995. <

References

American women psychologists
21st-century American psychologists
American science writers
Living people
1953 births
21st-century American women
20th-century American psychologists